Mastan Mirza (1 March 1926  25 June 1994), popularly known as Haji Mastan or Sultan Mirza, was an Indian mafia gang leader, originally from Tamil Nadu and based in Bombay. He was one of an infamous trio of mafia gang leaders in Bombay for over two decades from the 1960s to the early 1980s, along with Karim Lala leader of the Pathan gang, and Varadarajan Mudaliar, another famous gang leader from Tamil Nadu in South India.

At his peak, Mastan operated a powerful smuggling syndicate in Mumbai and along the Gujarat coast and later diversified into film financing and real estate business.

Mastan was known to be a shrewd businessman and a cunning deal-maker. He always maintained friendly relations with the police and government officials and often promoted peace between rival gangs, and was good friends with Lala, Mudaliar, Hassan Patni and Shiv Sena supremo Bal Thackeray.

Very early in his career, Mastan realized the importance of being seen among famous personalities from politics and the film industry as a symbol of power. Therefore, he hobnobbed among the city's rich and famous and was frequently seen with Bollywood personalities at public functions.

Mastan was arguably the most influential mafia don of his time. He was also seen as a "style icon" by many due to his extravagant lifestyle including immaculate white clothes, white shoes, white Mercedes cars and expensive gold watches. Mastan flaunted an extravagant lifestyle to appear affluent and influential.

Early life 
Haji Mastan was born in 1926 in a Tamil Muslim family in Panaikulam, an area mostly inhabited by Tamil Muslims in the Madras Presidency (modern-day Tamil Nadu) of British India. He lived in the coastal town of Cuddalore before migrating to Bombay  with his father at the age of 8.

Mastan started doing odd jobs as a small boy in the famous Crawford Market and soon joined the docks and started working long hours there. During his early twenties, due to the high import duty on gold, people started smuggling gold from overseas. Working in the docks made it easy for him to participate in smuggling and soon Mastan started his own business. Mastan began making a decent sum of money by diverting his sectors into this business. At an early age he also went on Hajj.

Adult life and death 
Mastan joined hands with Sukkur Narayan Bakhia, a smuggler from Daman to control the illegal items smuggled into Mumbai and Daman from the countries in the Persian Gulf. Mastan purchased properties at various locations in South Bombay including a sea-facing bungalow at Peddar Road. He lived in a small room built on the roof of his bungalow.

Mastan ventured into film financing later in his life, providing producers in Mumbai with some much-needed funds. He eventually turned into a film producer himself. He also had business interests in real estate, electronic goods, and hotels. He owned several electronic shops in Musafir Khana near Crawford Market.

Mastan maintained good relations with the other gang leaders. When inter-gang rivalry in Mumbai began to increase, he called all the top gang leaders together and split Mumbai between the gangs so that they could operate without coming into conflict. In this the mafia queen, Jenabai Daruwali helped him. Earlier Jenabai was known as Chavalvali, as she was doing business of selling ration in black market. But as she was ambitious, she developed contacts with the then liquor producer and seller, Varadarajan Mudliar alias Varda Bhai. After this, she came to be known as Jenabai Daruwali. Jenabai had good relations with Mastan, the Dawood Ibrahim family, and Karim Lala Pathan. So with the consent of Mastan she arranged a meeting of all rivals under one roof of Mastan's pedder road bungalow called Batul Suroor.

Later in life, Mastan did not take a direct role in running his gang, but instead, he depended on right-hand men like Lala and Mudaliar to carry out his smuggling operations and intimidate rivals and debtors. Mastan was especially close to Mudaliar as they were both from Tamil Nadu. When Mudaliar died, Mastan hired a private chartered plane to bring his body to Mumbai for the final rites.

During the Indian Emergency, he was imprisoned. Whilst in prison, he was influenced by the ideals of politician Jaiprakash Narayan and also began learning Hindi.

After his release from prison, Mastan entered politics and formed a political party in 1980-81 and named it Dalit Muslim Surakhsha Maha Sangh in 1985 which was later renamed as Bharatiya Minorities Suraksha Mahasangh currently led by Sundar Shaekhar

Mastan died of cardiac arrest on 25 June 1994.

In popular culture 
Several Indian movies have been based upon Haji's life:

 The 1975 Bollywood film Deewaar was loosely based on Haji Mastan's life, with Amitabh Bachchan portraying a fictionalized version of him. Deewaar was later remade into a 1981 Tamil film, Thee, starring Rajinikanth in the same role.
 The 2010 film Once Upon a Time in Mumbaai was heavily based on Haji Mastan's life, although it was also partially fictionalized. Ajay Devgn portrayed the character of Haji Mastan (as Sultan Mirza) in the film, while Emraan Hashmi portrays underworld don Dawood Ibrahim (as Shoaib Khan).
 On 25 May 2017, it was announced Rajnikanth's forthcoming film will be Kala Karikalan (released 2018) which is believed to be based on Mastan. His foster son Sundar Shekar Mishra sent a notice to Rajnikanth when he learned of this. In response, Wunderbar Films issued a statement clarifying that the film is not based on Mastan's life.
 The 2013 film Shootout at Wadala in which Akbar Khan played the role of Haji Mastan as Haji Maqsood.

References

External links

1926 births
1994 deaths
Indian gangsters
Indian crime bosses
Indian extortionists
Indian smugglers
20th-century Indian Muslims
Film producers from Mumbai
Indian filmmakers
Criminals from Mumbai
People from Ramanathapuram district
Deaths from cancer in India